Biz's Baddest Beats is a compilation album by Biz Markie. It was released on July 1, 1994, on Cold Chillin' Records.

Track listing
"One Two"- 2:20 
"Make the Music With Your Mouth, Biz"- 4:56 
"Biz Dance, Pt. 1"- 3:38 
"Nobody Beats the Biz"- 5:42 
"Just Rhymin' With Biz"- 4:01 
"Pickin' Boogers"- 4:42 
"Biz Is Goin' Off"- 4:50 
"Vapors"- 4:33 
"This Is Something for the Radio"- 5:14 
"Just a Friend"- 4:00 
"Spring Again"- 4:03 
"What Comes Around Goes Around"- 4:05 
"Let Me Turn You On"- 5:33 
"Young Girl Bluez"- 4:07 
"The Doo Doo"- 2:23

References

Biz Markie albums
1994 compilation albums